Park Seon-hong (born 5 November 1993) is a South Korean footballer who plays as a midfielder for Nakhon Si United.

Career statistics

Club

References

1993 births
Living people
South Korean footballers
South Korean expatriate footballers
Jeonju University alumni
Association football midfielders
K League 1 players
Gwangju FC players
South Korean expatriate sportspeople in Thailand
Expatriate footballers in Thailand
Nakhon Si United F.C. players